IQ motif and Sec7 domain 2 is a protein that in humans is encoded by the IQSEC2 gene.

Function 

The IQSEC2 gene encodes a guanine nucleotide exchange factor for the ARF family of GTP-binding proteins (see for example ARF1).

Clinical significance 

It is associated with X-Linked mental retardation 1.

References

Further reading

Human proteins